Mount Brøgger is a mountain,  high, which forms part of the north wall of Cleveland Glacier about  north of Referring Peak, in the Prince Albert Mountains, Victoria Land. It was charted by the British Antarctic Expedition, 1910–13, which named it for Professor Waldemar C. Brøgger, a Norwegian geologist and mineralogist.

References 

Mountains of Victoria Land
Scott Coast